Alexander McLachlan may refer to:
 Alexander McLachlan (politician)
 Alexander McLachlan (poet)